Naugama is a small village in Banswara District of Rajasthan, India. It is situated in Bagidora Tehsil.

History : The village is believed to have been created by refugees of 9 villages from Rajasthan and Gujarat states during an old famine. The word Nau-gama is derived from 9 (Nau) Villages (Gam).

The population is around 5000 as of 2014. However, if we add nearby newly created villages it touches 12000. Officially it is still 5000.

Village has mix of Rajputs (of Gujrat and Rajasthan) Patel's (of Gujarat), Brahmins (of Gujarat and Mewad) and Native (Adivasis). Village has significant population of Jains, which has made it a big trading center also. A good number of Muslims (mainly from Afghan origin) have settled in the village.

The village population is involved in agricultural activities. Due to availability of water, farmers here have 3 crops. some farmers even have 4th crop of vegetable in same fiend, during May–June.

People are quite educated. The village has a good number of teachers. There are some doctors, engineers and bankers also from the village.

Village has rare number of crimes.

Villages in Banswara district